Ardhendu Sekhar Mustafi (25 January 1850 — 5 September 1908) was a Bengali actor, playwright and theater personality.

Career
Mustafi was born at Bagbazar, Kolkata, British India in 1850. He studied in the Hare School. Mustafi first performed in 1867 in a satire drama Kichhu Kichhu Bujhi at Pathuriaghata Royal palace. He joined Bagbazar Amateur Theater group and performed in Sadhabar Ekadashi, written by novelist Dinabandhu Mitra. He was known as a rival and associates actor of Girish Chandra Ghosh. Mustafi helped Ghosh to establish the National Theater in 1872. Amrita Lal Basu described Mustafi as 'An actor made by God' because he could perform different type of characters in a play. In Nildarpan, Mustafi played both male and female roles including the characters of antagonist Englishman, Wood Sahib. He was also a successful drama teacher of Kolkata. Mustafi acted in various stages including Indian National Theater, Great National Theater, Emerald Theater, Arya Natya Samaj, Minerva, Aurora and Star Theater since 1872 to 1904. He also wrote a book named Binar Jhankar.

Plays
 Nabin Tapaswini
 Durgeshnandini
 Sirajddaula
 Mir Kashim
 Prafulla
 Rizia
 Pratapaditya
 Buro Shaliker Ghare Ro
 Meghnadbadh
 Balidan
 Hirakchurna

References

1850 births
1909 deaths
Indian theatre directors
Indian male stage actors
Bengali theatre personalities
19th-century Indian male actors
People from British India
Indian male dramatists and playwrights
Male actors from Kolkata
Hare School alumni